Pramod Kharel (born 6 November 1979) is a Nepalese singer. He is a versatile singer of the Nepali music industry. He has recorded more than 2000 songs of different genres. He is a coach in The Voice of Nepal Season 1 (2018), 2 (2019), 3 (2020-2021) & 4 (2022).

Personal life
Kharel obtained his master's degree in chemistry from Tribhuvan University in 2003. He also worked as a lecturer at Xavier International H.S.S. & College, Pyramid College and White Gold College.

Discography
 Prapti
 Pranaya
 Prabeg

Awards and nominations 
 Chhinalata singer of the year 2010
 Annapurna ghajal singer of the year 2010
 Annupurna singer of the year 2011
 Kalika best singer 2012
 Kalika best song of the year 2009
 Album of the year (Pranaya) 2010
 Kalika best ghazal (Khai Jaal Ma) 2010
 Radio Nepal Top Ten Singer Award in 2003
 Won Hits FM Music Award: Best male vocal performance
 Won Sagarmatha Music Awards: Best modern singer
 Nominated Kalika Music Award: Best pop singer
 Won Bindabashini Music Award: Best male pop singer

References

External links

 
 

1979 births
Living people
Nepalese playback singers
21st-century Nepalese male singers
People from Jhapa District
Khas people
Nepali-language singers